Alf Westman (4 January 1921 – 2 April 1998) was a Swedish hurdler. He competed in the men's 400 metres hurdles at the 1948 Summer Olympics.

References

1921 births
1998 deaths
Athletes (track and field) at the 1948 Summer Olympics
Swedish male hurdlers
Olympic athletes of Sweden
Place of birth missing